Heppiella is a genus of flowering plants belonging to the family Gesneriaceae.

Its native range is western South America to Venezuela. It is found in the countries of Colombia, Ecuador, Peru and Venezuela.

The genus name of Heppiella is in honour of Johann Adam Philipp Hepp (1797–1867), a German physician and lichenologist. It was first described and published in Gartenflora Vol.2 on page 353 in 1853.

Species, according to Kew:
Heppiella repens 
Heppiella ulmifolia 
Heppiella verticillata 
Heppiella viscida

References

Gesnerioideae
Gesneriaceae genera
Taxa named by Eduard August von Regel
Plants described in 1853
Flora of Colombia
Flora of Ecuador
Flora of Peru
[[Category:Flora of Venezuela